Crooks Can't Win is a 1928 American silent crime drama film directed by George M. Arthur and starring Ralph Lewis, Thelma Hill and Joe E. Brown.

Synopsis
A police officer is kicked off the force when his superior wrongly believes that he is complicit in a robbery committed by a gang his brother is involved with. With the assistance of a crime reporter, he sets out to round up the gang of thieves and clear his name.

Cast
 Ralph Lewis as Dad Gillen
 Thelma Hill as 	Mary Gillen
 Sam Nelson as Danny Malone
 Joe E. Brown as 	Jimmy Wells
 Eugene Strong as Alfred Dayton Jr
 Charlie Hall as 'Bull' Savage

References

Bibliography
 Connelly, Robert B. The Silents: Silent Feature Films, 1910-36, Volume 40, Issue 2. December Press, 1998.
 Gehring, Wes D. Joe E. Brown: Film Comedian and Baseball Buffoon. McFarland, 2014.
 Munden, Kenneth White. The American Film Institute Catalog of Motion Pictures Produced in the United States, Part 1. University of California Press, 1997.

External links
 

1928 films
1928 crime films
1920s English-language films
American silent feature films
American crime films
American black-and-white films
Film Booking Offices of America films
1920s American films